The American National Bank Building (also known as the Orange Blossom Hotel) at 1330 Main Street in Sarasota, Florida, United States is a historic bank. It was also a Hotel and Retirement Home. It was added to the U.S. National Register of Historic Places in 1998.

History

Construction and bank usage. 
The American National Bank was built on the former property of the Belle Haven Hotel known earlier as the DeSoto Hotel built in 1886. The hotel in May 1925 was put for sale at a price of $533,000 ( $7,341,328.80 in 2016) and was bought by the Adair Reality and Trust of Atlanta, Georgia. After purchasing the hotel, there were plans to tear it down and replace it with a new one. There had been rumors that it was to be replaced with an office building. In March 1926 the foundations of the building were laid and with all building materials sent in before being built and by April 1926 it was at 4 stories. On April 29, 1926 an article by The Week in Sarasota had titled a story "New Belle Haven Hotel on Bay Front Marks New Epoch in History of Sarasota and Its Commanding Position as a Resort City." The cost of the building was estimated to be at about $3,000,000 to $3,500,000 (about $40,000,000 to $47,000,000 in 2016), and in late April, 1926 the American National Bank moved into the new building.

Hotel usage 
Sarasota in the 1930s saw a growth in tourists coming here. In 1936 with a growth in tourism Joseph Spadaro from Boca Grande bought it and converted it into a hotel. It was described by R.L. Polk City Phone Directories as "a fireproof building built of steel and concrete, steam heat and with 2 elevators and 125 rooms". There was a room called the Aztec Room a cocktail lounge was popular with tourists and residents in the area. The hotel was sold in 1946 to Louis Swed from Tampa and Associates for $225,000 (about $2,000,000 in 2016). There were plans to redo the hotel's rooms and add a coffee bar and a restaurant. In 1946 the Orange Blossom Hotel Corporation was formed and had Lewis Swed, Jack Shapiro and M. B. Sullivan as executives. In 1950 the hotel was sold to Elizabeth Fitizie and Mrs. Thomas Kewley for in excess of $300,000 (worth about $3,000,000 in 2016.) The new owners took a major part in the hotel's operation and the dining room. The Hotel did have Jimmy Roosevelt and Peter Lawford as notable guests of the hotel.  The hotel struggled with business during the 1950s and 1960s when new hotels were being opened in Sarasota.

Retirement Facility 
In 1967, it was announced that the Trustees of the Sarasota Non-Profit foundation had purchased the hotel and decided to use it as a nursing home with 60 rooms. The next year, the hotel was modernized and even made it into being in the Building Magazine in the magazines Modernization Citation. In the 1980s when a large amount of its lifetime tenants didn't occupy the building it was closed.

References

External links
 Sarasota County listings at National Register of Historic Places
 American National Bank Building at Florida's Office of Cultural and Historical Programs

National Register of Historic Places in Sarasota County, Florida
Bank buildings on the National Register of Historic Places in Florida
Commercial buildings completed in 1926
Buildings and structures in Sarasota, Florida
Office buildings in Florida
1926 establishments in Florida